Lucifer is a studio album by American pianist Kenny Barron which was recorded in 1975 and released on the Muse label.

Track listing 
All compositions by Kenny Barron except where noted.

 "Spirits" – 9:00
 "Firefly" – 8:52
 "Ethereally Yours" – 5:53
 "Hellbound" – 13:00
 "Lucifer" – 5:36
 "Oleo" (Sonny Rollins) – 5:03

Personnel 
Kenny Barron – piano, clavinet, electric piano, string synthesizer, cowbells
Charles Sullivan – trumpet (tracks 1, 2 & 5)
Bill Barron – soprano saxophone (tracks 1, 2 & 5)
James Spaulding – alto saxophone, bass flute (tracks 1-3 & 5)
Carlos Alomar – acoustic guitar, electric guitar (tracks 1, 2 & 5)
Chris White – electric bass (tracks 1, 2 & 5)
Billy Hart – drums (tracks 1, 2 & 5)

References 

Kenny Barron albums
1975 albums
Muse Records albums
Albums produced by Michael Cuscuna